The French ironclad Belliqueuse ("Bellicose") was a wooden-hulled, armored corvette, built for the French Navy in the 1860s and designed as a cheap ironclad. She was the first French ironclad to sail around the world, which she did between December 1867 and May 1869. She spent the bulk of her career in the Pacific before returning to Toulon, where she was used as a target in 1886.

Design and description
Belliqueuse was designed as a small and cheap ironclad suitable for foreign deployments. Her armament and armor was concentrated in the middle of the ship like a central battery ironclad, but unlike those ships she lacked armored transverse bulkheads and was very vulnerable to raking fire.

Propulsion
The ship had a single horizontal return connecting-rod steam engine driving a single propeller. Her engine was powered by four oval boilers. On sea trials the engine produced  and the ship reached .

Armament
Belliqueuse mounted her four  Modèle 1864 guns in the central battery on the battery deck along with four of her six   Modèle 1864 guns. The other two 164 mm guns were carried on pivot mounts fore and aft on the upper deck. She was partially rearmed in 1870 and exchanged her 164 mm pivot guns for a pair of  Modèle 1870 guns. In addition four  Hotchkiss 5-barrel revolving guns each were added. They had a rate of fire of about 30 rounds per minute.

Armor
Fore and aft of the battery, her sides were unprotected.

Service
Belliqueuse was laid down at Toulon in September 1863, and launched on 6 September 1865. The ship began her sea trials on 30 December 1865, but did not enter service until 30 October 1866. On 22 December 1867, the ship departed Toulon in an attempt to circumnavigate the world. Belliqueuse arrived at Brest on 26 May 1869 after 396 days at sea, the first French ironclad to do so. On 15 November 1869 she hoisted the flag of Rear Admiral Chevalier as commander of the Levant Squadron. During 1870 she was transferred to New Caledonia as flagship of the Western Pacific Division, but returned to Toulon on 5 June 1871 after Chevalier's death. She returned to Toulon on 3 May 1874.

Belliqueuse served with the Squadron of Evolutions (Escadre d'évolution) for six months from 5 June 1877 and was reduced to reserve afterwards. She was paid off on 15 November 1884 and struck off the navy list on 3 May 1886. Belliqueuse was then used as a target in experiments with high capacity shells. Belliqueuse was sold at Toulon for demolition in 1889.

Notes

Footnotes

References
 

 
 

Ships built in France
Ironclad warships of the French Navy
Corvettes of France
1865 ships